Iraj Mikaeilzadeh (born in Urmia, West Azerbaijan)  is a volleyball player from Iran, who plays as a libero for Shahrdari Urmia VC in Iranian Volleyball Super League.

References

External links
 Shahrdari Urmia VC

Living people
Iranian men's volleyball players
People from Urmia
Year of birth missing (living people)